BCN, also known as bicyclo[6.1.0]non-4-yne, is a copper-free click chemistry probe that enables highly efficient and completely orthogonal bioconjugation to complex macromolecules including peptides, nucleic acids and proteins, including monoclonal antibodies.  The most recent and powerful application of this technology has been in the field of antibody-drug conjugates which results in targeted cancer therapeutics that have an improved therapeutic index, meaning they are more effective and better tolerated.  BCN is well-suited for aqueous bioconjugations due to its high reactivity with its azide counterpart and its high hydrophilicity, relative to other metal-free click chemistry probes.

References 

Bicyclic compounds
Cyclopropanes